Hidden Lake is a lake located on Vancouver Island east of  Mount Arrowsmith.

Fishing

Wild populations of native coastal cutthroat trout are found in Hidden Lake. Hidden Lake is stocked annually with rainbow trout.

References

Alberni Valley
Lakes of Vancouver Island
Cameron Land District